The Agrifina Circle, officially the Teodoro F. Valencia Circle, is a traffic circle within the eastern portion of Rizal Park in Manila, the Philippines.

Etymology
The name "Agrifina" is a portmanteau of the words "Agriculture" and "Finance" since two neoclassical buildings located on opposite ends of the circle formerly housed the Departments of Agriculture and Finance. The former building of the Department of Finance formerly housed the Department of Tourism until 2015, when the building was vacated to make way for the new National Museum of Natural History.

The circle was officially renamed to Teodoro F. Valencia Circle on January 5, 1990 through Republic Act No. 6836, 
after the longtime head of the park who initiated and maintained the park's beautification.

History
The Agrifina Circle was intended to be a grand civic plaza surrounded by the planned Capitol Building and five wedge-shaped buildings which included the Finance and Agriculture Buildings, according to the Burnham Plan of Manila by American architect Daniel Burnham.

After World War II, when it was decided that the capital of the Philippines was to be moved to Quezon City, the then-plaza was converted into a roundabout. Vehicular traffic was allowed in road until the late 1960s when Rizal Park was consolidated and most roads going through the park were pedestrianized. A globe fountain and skating rink was installed at the central island.

There were plans to construct Luneta Tower, a  observation tower, at the Agrifina Circle for the Centennial celebration of Philippine Independence in 1998. The decision to build the tower at the site, however, was controversial and the plan was eventually shelved.

In 1998, the Binhi ng Kalayaan Monument replaced the fountain but the skating rink remained. The monument was later moved to a barren area of Rizal Park in 2004 and was replaced by Sentinel of Freedom, a monument dedicated to Lapulapu.

Layout

References

Streets in Manila
Tourist attractions in Manila
Roundabouts and traffic circles in the Philippines